The 2015 San Antonio Scorpions FC season was the club's fourth season of existence and its fourth and last season in the North American Soccer League, the second division of the American soccer pyramid. Including the San Antonio Thunder soccer franchise of the original NASL, this was the 6th season of professional soccer in San Antonio. The Scorpions entered the 2015 NASL season as the reigning league champions after defeating the Fort Lauderdale Strikers 2-1 in the 2014 Soccer Bowl.

The 2015 season was sponsored by San Antonio-based deeproot Funds through a partnership.

Roster

Transfers

Transfers in

Transfers out

Competitions

Pre-season 
Kickoff times are in CDT (UTC-05) unless shown otherwise

deeproot Funds Cup

Hill Country Derby

International Friendlies

Friendlies 
Kickoff times are in CDT (UTC-05) unless shown otherwise

NASL Spring Season 

The spring season will last for 10 games beginning on April 4 and ending on June 13.  The schedule will feature a single round robin format with each team playing every other team in the league a single time.  All teams will play 5 home games and 5 away games. The winner of the spring season will automatically qualify for the 2015 NASL Playoffs (The Championship).

Standings

Results summary

Results by round

Matches 
Kickoff times are in CDT (UTC-05) unless shown otherwise

Awards

NASL Fall Season 

The fall season will last for 20 games beginning on July 4 and ending on October 21. The schedule will feature a double round robin format with each team playing every other team in the league two times. All teams will play 10 home games and 10 away games. The winner of the fall season will automatically qualify for the 2015 NASL Playoffs (The Championship).

Standings

Results summary

Results by round

Matches 
Kickoff times are in CDT (UTC-05) unless shown otherwise

Awards

U.S. Open Cup

References 

San Antonio Scorpions seasons
San Antonio Scorpions Football Club
San Antonio Scorpions Football Club
San Antonio Scorpions